Psammisia is a genus of flowering plants in the family Ericaceae.  It contains the fruiting bushes commonly called joyapas and is distributed throughout the Neotropics.

Description
They are terrestrial or epiphytic shrubs. Leaves usually alternate, rarely subopposite to opposite, petiolate or rarely subsessile, coriaceous, plinerveal or pinnatinerveal, the margins entire. Axillary or terminal inflorescences, subfasciculate or racemose with few to many flowers; flower bract 1, small; pedicels articulated with calyx; bracteoles 2, usually basal. Flowers 5-mere, scentless, aestivation valved; synsepalous calyx, the tube terete, rarely winged, the limb erect or patent; corolla sympetalous, subcylindrical, elongated, urceolate or subglobose, fleshy; stamens (8-)10(-12), equal, 1/3 of the corolla to almost as long as it; filaments distinct or connate, the same, the connectives all lateral and distally 2-spurred or without spurs (spurs rarely inconspicuous or absent), the spurs acute and conspicuous or rounded and not very apparent; anthers equal, rigid, disintegration tissue absent, thecae granular, tubules distinct, 1/4 length of thecae to about as long as them, dehiscent by elongated introrse slits; threadless pollen of viscina; inferior ovary. Fruits in berries, coriaceous.

Species
Species include:

References

External links

NYBG key

Vaccinioideae
Ericaceae genera